The dorsal nucleus of vagus nerve (or posterior nucleus of vagus nerve or dorsal vagal nucleus or nucleus dorsalis nervi vagi or nucleus posterior nervi vagi) is a cranial nerve nucleus for the vagus nerve in the medulla that lies ventral to the floor of the fourth ventricle. It mostly serves parasympathetic vagal functions in the gastrointestinal tract, lungs, and other thoracic and abdominal vagal innervations. These functions include, among others, bronchoconstriction and gland secretion.  The cell bodies for the preganglionic parasympathetic vagal neurons that innervate the heart reside in the nucleus ambiguus.

Additional cell bodies are found in the nucleus ambiguus, which give rise to the branchial efferent motor fibers of the vagus nerve (CN X) terminating in the laryngeal, pharyngeal muscles, and musculus uvulae.

Additional images

See also
 Vagovagal reflex, gastrointestinal tract reflex circuits where afferent and efferent fibers of the vagus nerve.
 Nucleus ambiguus

References

External links
 
 
 Overview at mcgill.ca
 NIF Search - Dorsal nucleus of vagus nerve via the Neuroscience Information Framework

Vagus nerve
Cranial nerve nuclei
Medulla oblongata